A list of films produced in Iran ordered by year of release in the 1970s. For an alphabetical list of Iranian films see :Category:Iranian films

1970s

External links
 Iranian film at the Internet Movie Database

1970s
Iranian
Films